Badruddoza Ahmed Shuja is a Bangladeshi politician. He was elected a member of the 1988 fourth Jatiya Sangsad from Sunamganj-1 for the Jatiya Party.

Birth and early life 
Badruddoza Ahmed Shuja was born in the Sunamganj District in the Sylhet Division. His father is Abdul Khalek, then parliamentary secretary of the National Assembly of Pakistan.

Political life 
Badruddoza Ahmed Shuja is the president of Bangladesh Muslim League. He was elected a member of the fourth Jatiya Sangsad from Sunamganj-1 for the Jatiya Party. He was defeated by participating in the Jatiya Sangsad elections of 1991, 2001 and 2018.

References 

Bangladeshi politicians
Jatiya Party politicians
People from Sunamganj District
4th Jatiya Sangsad members